The 2018–19 Moldovan Women Top League season in association football was the 19th since its establishment. The season began on 2 September 2018 and ended on 26 May 2019. Agarista-ȘS Anenii Noi were the defending champions.

Teams

Format
The schedule consists of two rounds, each team plays each other once home-and-away for a total of 16 matches per team.

League table

Results

References

External links
Women Top League - Moldova - Results, fixtures, tables - FMF

Moldovan Women Top League 2018-19
Moldovan Women Top League seasons
Moldova